The Wuling Asta is a compact crossover SUV produced by SAIC-GM-Wuling through the Wuling brand since 2021.

Overview 

The Asta was released on the April 2021 Auto Shanghai as part of Wuling's model offensive among regular passenger cars. It is built on the same platform as the Baojun 530.

The design of Asta follows the style of the Victory minivan, with a trapezoidal grille with a wing motif, and boomerang-shaped LED lighting. In addition, like the Victory, the Asta is equipped with a silver corporate logo for the global model range.

The Asta is powered by a turbocharged 1.5-litre LJO four-cylinder engine producing . The engine is mated to either a six-speed manual or a continuously variable transmission with eight pre-programmed gear ratios.

The Asta is the second model designed for global markets, after the Victory. Firstly, its sale began on the domestic Chinese market, with plans to start sales in export countries in 2022.

Hybrid 
The Asta HEV was released in August 2022.

References

External links 

  (in Chinese)

Xingchen
Cars introduced in 2021
Compact sport utility vehicles
Crossover sport utility vehicles
Front-wheel-drive vehicles
Vehicles with CVT transmission
Cars of China